Prince of Rui, was a first-rank princely peerage used during Ming dynasty, this peerage title was created by Wanli Emperor. The first Prince of Rui was Zhu Changhao, 5th son of Wanli Emperor. This peerage later abolished by Qing court after the 2nd prince, Zhu Yousi surrender to the Qing court.

The peerage was created in 1601, continued to 1646. The fief of this peerage was located at Hanzhong.

Generation name / poem
As members of this peerage was descentants of Yongle Emperor, their generation poem was:-

This peerage used the poem until You (由) generation.

Members

Zhu Changhao (朱常浩; 1590 - 1644) (1st), he granted and held the title of Prince of Rui in 1601 and took his fief which located at Hanzhong in 1627. He escaped to Sichuan for the pursue of Shun forces in 1637, and later moved to Chongqing. He was killed by Zhang Xianzhong at Hanzhong, in 1644.
Zhu Yousi (朱由𣏌) (2nd), he succeeded and held the title after the killed of his father, in 1644. He surrender to the Qing court in 1646 and the peerage was abolished. 

Ming dynasty princely peerages
Imperial families of Ming dynasty